Margot Williams is a journalist and research librarian, who was part of teams at the Washington Post that won two Pulitzer Prizes.
In 1998, Williams was part of a team that won the Pulitzer Gold Medal for public service for reporting on the high rate of police shootings in Washington, D.C.
In 2002, Williams was part of a team that won the Pulitzer Prize for National Reporting for its coverage of the "war on terror".

Education

Acting career

Williams worked as a dancer and as an actress prior to finishing her academic career.

Career in Journalism

Early in her career in journalism, Williams worked as the Library Director at the Poughkeepsie Journal.

In 1990, Williams joined the Washington Post.
While there, Williams was one of the contributors to the "Networkings" column.

In 2004, Williams joined to the New York Times.
While working at the New York Times, Williams spearheaded the paper's publication of a searchable database of 16,000 pages of documents produced by the Office for the Administrative Review of Detained Enemy Combatants.
The New York Times introduced its "Guantanamo Dockets" on November 3, 2008. The dockets are based on the personal notes Williams had started to compile as she read all 16,000 pages concerning the detainees at Guantanamo Bay.

In 2010, Williams left The New York Times and joined National Public Radio as a correspondent.

Author

In 1981, Williams wrote the book, Cuba from Columbus to Castro.
In 1999, Williams wrote the book, GREAT SCOUTS: CyberGuides for Subject Searching on the Web.

Awards

References

American women journalists
Living people
Year of birth missing (living people)
21st-century American women